Epp Kaidu (pseudonym; real name Leida Ird, born Leida Rosenblatt; 15 April 1915 Jäärja Parish – 23 June 1976 Tallinn) was Soviet and Estonian theatre director and actress.

In 1936 she graduated from Tartu Stage Art Studio. In 1952 she graduated from higher courses of direction in Moscow. From 1937 until 1939, she worked at Tartu Töölisteater. From 1940 until 1941, she worked at the Vanemuine theatre in Tartu. From 1942 until 1944, she belonged to Estonian SSR State Artistic Ensembles. 1944-1976 she worked as a theatre director at Vanemuine Theatre.

In 1936, she wed theatre director and actor Kaarel Ird.

Awards
Estonian SSR State Prize (1947, 1948, 1972)
Order of the Red Banner of Labour (1956)
People's Artist of the Estonian SSR (1957)
Order of the Presidium of the Supreme Soviet of the Estonian SSR (1965)
Order of Friendship of Peoples (1975)

Productions of plays

 Jakobson's Võitlus rindejooneta (1947)
 Dunajevski's Vaba tuul (1948)
 Miljutin's Rahutu õnn (1949)

References

1915 births
1976 deaths
20th-century Estonian actresses
People from Kreis Pernau
People from Saarde Parish
Communist Party of the Soviet Union members
People's Artists of the Estonian Soviet Socialist Republic
Recipients of the Order of Friendship of Peoples
Recipients of the Order of the Red Banner of Labour
Estonian stage actresses
Estonian theatre directors
Estonian women film directors
Soviet stage actresses
Soviet theatre directors
Soviet women film directors